Shayne Bolton (born 29 June 2000) is a South African rugby union player, currently playing for United Rugby Championship and European Rugby Champions Cup side Connacht. He plays centre.

Connacht
Bolton joined Connacht in June 2021 having previously played in the Varsity Cup for Shimlas in South Africa.

References

External links
itsrugby.co.uk Profile

2000 births
Living people
South African rugby union players
Rugby union players from Pretoria
Connacht Rugby players
Rugby union centres